Altmann is a surname. Notable people with the surname include:

 Alexander Altmann (1906–1987), Hungarian-American professor of Judaic studies
 Barbara K. Altmann (born 1957), Canadian academic and college administrator
 Danny Altmann, British immunologist
 Dora Altmann (1881–1971), German actress
 Elisabeth Altmann-Gottheiner (1874–1930), the first female German University lecturer
 Gila Altmann (born 1949), German politician and member of the Green Party
 Margaret Altmann (1900–1984), biologist
 Maria Altmann, the plaintiff in Republic of Austria v. Altmann
 Richard Altmann (1852–1900), German pathologist
 Ros Altmann, British pensions campaigner
 Wilhelm Altmann (1862–1951), German historian

See also
 Altman (surname)

German-language surnames
Jewish surnames
Surnames from nicknames